Ken Malcolm (25 July 1926 – 23 May 2006) was a Scottish professional footballer. He was born in Aberdeen. During his career he made over 250 appearances for Ipswich Town.

References

External links 

Ken Malcolm at Pride of Anglia

1926 births
2006 deaths
Scottish footballers
Association football fullbacks
Footballers from Aberdeen
Arbroath F.C. players
Ipswich Town F.C. players
Scottish Football League players
English Football League players
Ipswich Town F.C. non-playing staff